The 2002 Holiday Bowl was a college football bowl game played December 27, 2002 in San Diego, California. It was part of the 2002 NCAA Division I-A football season. It featured the Arizona State Sun Devils against the Kansas State Wildcats. Kansas State won the game by a 34–27 final score.

After a scoreless first quarter, Arizona State scored first following a 6-yard touchdown pass from quarterback Andrew Walter to wide receiver Justin Taplin for an early 7–0 lead. Arizona State added to the lead when Matt Barth drilled a 26-yard field goal to put Arizona State up 10–0. Kansas State finally got on the board when running back Darren Sproles rushed 41 yards for a touchdown making it 10–7. Running back Hakim Hill answered for ASU by rushing 9 yards for a touchdown, making it 17–7. Matt Barth later connected on a 39-yard field goal, increasing ASU's lead to 20–7. Before halftime, quarterback Ell Roberson rushed 32 yards for a touchdown, pulling Kansas State to within 20–14.

The defenses held in the third quarter, and the score remained 20–14 heading into the fourth quarter. Kansas State's Ell Roberson scored on a 3-yard touchdown run, but a missed PAT left the score tied at 20. Andrew Walter threw a 10-yard touchdown pass to wide receiver Mike Williams to give Arizona State a 27–20 fourth quarter lead. Ell Roberson scored the tying touchdown on a 1-yard quarterback sneak with just 7 minutes left in the game. With only 75 seconds left in the game, Roberson threw a 10-yard touchdown pass to Derrick Evans for the winning score.

References

Holiday Bowl
Holiday Bowl
Arizona State Sun Devils football bowl games
Kansas State Wildcats football bowl games
2002 in sports in California
December 2002 sports events in the United States